A receiving house (sometimes called a roadhouse) is a theatre which does not produce its own repertoire but instead receives touring theatre companies, usually for a brief period such as three nights or a full week. The incoming company may receive a share of the box office takings or a minimum guaranteed payment.

West End theatres in London and most Broadway theatres in New York are also receiving houses, as the venue solely provides facilities to the incoming show even though the production may stay for many years.

Theatres which produce their own shows are known as producing houses, and some regional theatres will do both.

Stage terminology
Theatrical management